The Hong Kong national futsal team represents Hong Kong during international futsal competitions. It is under the direction of the Hong Kong Football Association. The national team was first formed in 1992 due to the 1992 FIFA Futsal World Championship being held in Hong Kong.

Tournaments

FIFA Futsal World Cup
 1989 – Did not enter
 1992 – Round 1 (host)
 1996 – Did not enter
 2000 – Did not enter
 2004 – Did not qualify
 2008 – Did not enter
 2012 – Did not qualify
 2016 – Did not qualify
 2020 – Did not qualify

AFC Futsal Championship
 1999 – Did not enter
 2000 – Did not enter
 2001 – Did not enter
 2002 – Did not enter
 2003 – Round 1
 2004 – Round 1
 2005 – Round 1
 2006 – Round 1
 2007 – Round 1
 2008 – Did not enter
 2010 – Did not qualify
 2012 – Did not qualify
 2014 – Did not qualify
 2016 – Did not qualify

EAFF Futsal Championship
 2009 – Group stage
 2013 – Fourth place

Latest squad 
Squad called up for the AFC Men Futsal Asian Cup Qualifiers. The captioned tournament is held from May 17 to May 21 in Malaysia.

Coaches
 1992: Victor Hermans
 2003–2009: Tsang Wai Chung

References

External links
Team on the HKFA website
RSSSF Archive

Asian national futsal teams
Futsal
National futsal
National
1992 establishments in Hong Kong
National sports teams established in 1992